Subbiah is a male Indian name. Notable people with the name include:

Given or middle name
A. R. Subbiah Mudaliar, Indian politician
C. P. Subbiah Mudaliar (1895–1967), Indian freedom fighter
M. Subbiah Pandian, Indian politician
Subbiah Arunachalam (born 1941), Indian information consultant
Subbiah Arunan, Indian space scientist

Surname
M. V. Subbiah, Indian industrialist
S. Subbiah, Indian politician
Saravana Subbiah, Indian film director and actor
Saraswathi Subbiah (1924–2005), Indian communist politician
Susi Ganeshan (born Ganesan Subbiah in 1971), Indian film director, producer and screenwriter
V. Subbiah (1911–1993), Indian communist politician
G. Venkatasubbiah (1913–2021), Kannada writer, grammarian, editor, lexicographer and critic

Indian masculine given names